EuroBasket, also commonly referred to as the European Basketball Championship, is the main international basketball competition that is contested quadrennially, by the senior men's national teams that are governed by FIBA Europe, which is the European zone within the International Basketball Federation.

The competition was first held in 1935. The former Soviet Union holds the record for most gold medals with a total of 14. The tournament is generally held in August or September, in the offseason of major club competitions. The current defending champion is Spain, who won the 2022 title.

History

Beginning

The first championships was held three years after the establishment of FIBA, in 1935. Switzerland was chosen as the host country, and ten countries joined. Only one qualifying match was played between Portugal and Spain. With a complicated formula, the final would see Latvia as champions. According to the rule at the time, the winner had to hold the following games. The following two tournaments would be won by Lithuania and would see the introduction of Egypt who would compete in EuroBasket until 1953 winning one championship at home in 1949 along the way. The 1941 edition of the tournament was scheduled be held in Lithuania as well, but was cancelled due to WWII.

Soviet dominance
After the 1946 edition saw the first jump shot performed by Italian player Giuseppe Stefanini, the following edition would see the Soviet Union compete in their first edition in the 1947 edition and would see the Soviets win the first of eleven out of the next thirteen European championships. During the 50s, the Soviet Union won four of the five competitions held during the decade with the only tournament that they did not win being the 1955 edition. This was won by Hungary as they finished top while the Soviets finished in third place. It was also during that edition that the thirty-second shot clock was introduced, which changed the style of basketball.

The Soviets would take out all of the championships during the 60s with them having a fifty-five game winning streak which would be broken by Yugoslavia in 1969. For Yugoslavia, they were starting to come to challenge the Soviets with the main player in Radivoj Korac aiding the team to two silvers and a bronze medal, in his career which stopped in 1967. The 1960s would see also a change in how the competition was viewed and run with FIBA putting a limit on the number of countries that entered to 16 with qualifiers being the way to bring them down to that number as it first appeared in 1963. The following edition would see the competition not be held in one city with Tbilisi joining Moscow in hosting games and in 1967 the first modern games were held, because the games were televised and international media were present.

Rise of Yugoslavia
The 1970s were the competition between Yugoslavia and the Soviet Union. During the decade Yugoslavia won three gold medals and the Soviet Union taking out the remaining two. After the Soviets took out 1971, the 1973 edition would finally see Yugoslavia take out their first championship after Spain defeated the Soviets in the semi-finals to qualify for their first final since the first edition way back in 1935. Yugoslavia would finally have a chance to defeat the Soviets as at home, they would get the chance to defeat them and they did as they won by six points to take home 1975 edition. After following that up in 1977, the Soviets would get their revenge in the final round at EuroBasket 1979 when they defeated them 96–77 to qualify through to the final where they would defeat Israel who shocked the basketball world as they defeated Yugoslavia in the opening round by a point.

Brewing under the Soviets and Yugoslavs, Western Europe was starting to appear with the 1980s seeing the change happen. In 1983, the Western side of Europe tasted success with Italy defeating Spain in the final to record their first of two titles. An important development happened in the following edition which was held in Germany. That edition saw the first three-point arc being used.

New winners emerge and Spanish dominance
Greece would win the next edition in 1987 at home after remarkable victory over heavily favored Soviet Union, with a 103–101 score in a gripping final decided in overtime. At the 1989 edition, Greece beat the Soviet team again in the semifinals with a one-point margin but then lost to hosts Yugoslavia in the final. EuroBasket 1991 was the first EuroBasket tournament in which currently active NBA players, that had also already played in an official NBA regular season game were allowed to participate. It would also be the first edition where the Soviets weren't entered into the competition, as the USSR didn't qualify for the main tournament and afterwards collapsed. Yugoslavia would take the title, but afterwards war would split the country up with Jure Zdovc being a "casualty" after Slovenia declared independence, two days into the tournament. 1993 saw a shock winner, with Germany taking the championship at home with a one-point victory over Russia. After being suspended in 1993, FR Yugoslavia came back and took the trophy after defeating Lithuania who was making its first appearance, since it had been a Soviet Republic. But politics came into play with the crowd protesting "Lithuania is the champions", while the Croatian team who had defeated Greece for bronze step down from the podium in protest of the war that was happening at the time. Nevertheless, FR Yugoslavia managed to repeat their success in 1997 after victory over Italy in the final match.

Italy managed to win the last title of the 20th century, defeating Spain in the 1999 final. In 2001, FR Yugoslavia regained European title but it was their last victory at the EuroBasket. In 2003, Lithuania defeated Spain in the final match and won their first European trophy since 1939. In 2005, Greece repeated success of 1987 after beating Germany in the final match.

2007 saw a shock winner, with Russia taking their first EuroBasket title since the dissolution of the Soviet Union with a one-point victory over heavily favored Spanish hosts in Madrid. However, the next tournaments were dominated by Spain who finally gained their maiden European title in 2009 and then won 3 of 5 next editions. In 2013, France won their first European title. In 2017, Slovenia won the trophy, becoming the 14th country to win the EuroBasket. But in general, the first decades of the 21st century have been characterized by the dominance of Spanish team who has reached at least the semifinals of the 11 last tournaments, obtaining at these editions a total of four gold, three silver and three bronze medals, including the current title of 2022.

Qualification
24 European teams take part in the final competition. The qualification format that existed until the 2011 EuroBasket permitted 16 teams to compete. Eight spots were determined by the host nation and the top seven finishers of the previous EuroBasket. The remaining Division A teams compete in a qualification tournament. There, they were divided into four groups. Each group played a double round-robin. The top team in each group qualified for EuroBasket. The best three of the four runners-up also qualified.

Of the ten teams that did not qualify in the qualification tournament, the six best got another chance in the additional qualification round. The remaining four competed in a relegation round, with two being sent to Division B for the next qualification cycle (and replaced by the two best teams from Division B).

The final spot was determined by the additional qualifying round. The six teams were divided into two groups of three, with each group playing a double round-robin. The top team in each group played in the final against the other group's top team; the winner of that game received the final EuroBasket qualification spot.

In 2015, the national team of Iceland became the smallest nation to ever qualify for a EuroBasket final stage at the population of around 330.000 people. The team was led by the former Dallas Maverick, Jón Arnór Stefánsson followed by a great performance which drove them through the qualifiers. In 2017, Iceland made back to back qualification to a EuroBasket final stage, then led by the young Martinn Hermansson.

Competition format
EuroBasket has used a number of different formats, ranging from the simple round-robin used in 1939, to a three-stage tournament, and now a two-stage tournament that is currently in use.

The current format begins with a preliminary round. The twenty-four qualified teams are placed into four groups of six, and each group plays a round-robin tournament. The top four teams in each group (16 overall) advance to the knockout stage. The knockout stage is a 16-team single-elimination tournament, with a bronze medal game for semi-final losers and classification games for the quarterfinal losers to determine fifth to eighth places.

Results
{| class=wikitable style="text-align:center; font-size:90%; width:100%"
|+Summaries
! rowspan="2" style="width:5%;"|Year
! rowspan="2" style="width:13%;"|Hosts
!colspan=3|Gold medal game
!colspan=3|Bronze medal game
! rowspan="2" style="width:3%;"|Number of teams
|-
!width=15%|Gold
!width=6.5%|Score
!width=15%|Silver
!width=15%|Bronze
!width=6.5%|Score
!width=15%|Fourth place
|-
|1935
|align="left"| 
|
|24–18
|
|
|25–23
|
|10
|-
|1937
|align="left"|
|
|24–23
|
|
|27–24
|
|8
|-
|1939
|align="left"|
|
|No playoffs
|
|
|No playoffs
|
|8
|-
|1941
|align="left"|
| colspan="7" style="text-align:center;"|Cancelled due to World War II
|-
|1946
|align="left"|
|
|34–32
|
|
|38–32
|
|10
|-
|1947
|align="left"|
|
|56–37
|
|
|50–48
|
|14
|-
|1949
|align="left"|
|
|No playoffs
|
|
|No playoffs
|
|7
|-
|1951
|align="left"|
|
|45–44
|
|
|55–52
|
|18
|-
|1953
|align="left"|
|
|No playoffs
|
|
|No playoffs
|
|17
|-
|1955
|align="left"|
|
|No playoffs
|
|
|No playoffs
|
|18
|-
|1957
|align="left"|
|
|No playoffs
|
|
|No playoffs
|
|16
|-
|1959
|align="left"|
|
|No playoffs
|
|
|No playoffs
|
|17
|-
|1961
|align="left"|
|
|60–53
|
|
|55–46
|
|19
|-
|1963
|align="left"|
|
|61–45
|
|
|89–61
|
|16
|-
|1965
|align="left"|
|
|58–49
|
|
|86–70
|
|16
|-
|1967
|align="left"|
|
|89–77
|
|
|80–76
|
|16
|-
|1969 
|align="left"|
|
|81–72
|
|
|77–75
|
|12
|-
|1971
|align="left"|
|
|69–64
|
|
|85–67
|
|12
|-
|1973
|align="left"|
||78–67
|
|
|90–58
|
|12
|-
|1975
|align="left"|
|
|No playoffs
|
|
|No playoffs
|
|12
|-
|1977
|align="left"|
|
|74–61
|
|
|91–81
|
|12
|-
|1979
|align="left"|
|
|98–76
|
|
|99–92
|
|12
|-
|1981
|align="left"|
|
|84–67
|
|
|101–90
|
|12
|-
|1983
|align="left"|
|
|105–96
|
|
|105–70
|
|12
|-
|1985
|align="left"|
|
|120–89
|
|
|102–90
|
|12
|-
|1987
|align="left"|
|
|103–101  overtime
|
|
|98–87
|
|12
|-
|1989
|align="left"|
|
|98–77
|
|
|104–76
|
|8
|-
|1991
|align="left"|
|
|88–73
|
|
|101–83
|
|8
|-
|1993
|align="left"|
|
|71–70
|
|
|99–59
|
|16
|-
|1995
|align="left"|
|
|96–90
|
|
|73–68
|
|14
|-
|1997
|align="left"|
|
|61–49
|
|
|97–77
|
|16
|-
|1999
|align="left"|
|
|64–56
|
|
|74–62
|
|16
|-
|2001
|align="left"|
|
|78–69
|
|
|99–90
|
|16
|-
|2003
|align="left"|
|
|93–84
|
|
|69–67
|
|16
|-
|2005
|align="left"|
|
|78–62
|
|
|98–68
|
|16
|-
|2007
|align="left"|
|
|60–59
|
|
|78–69
|
|16
|-
|2009
|align="left"|
|
|85–63
|
|
|57–56
|
|16
|-
|2011
|align="left"|
|
|98–85
|
|
|72–68
|
|24
|-
|2013
|align="left"|
|
|80–66
|
|
|92–66
|
|24
|-
|2015
|align="left"|
|
|80–63
|
|
|81–68
|
|24
|-
|2017
|align="left"|
|
|93–85
|
|
|93–85
|
|24
|-
|2022
|align="left"|
|
|88–76
|
|
|82–69
|
|24
|-
|2025
|align="left"|
|
|
|
|
|
|
|24
|}

Medal table
The medal table below lists the national teams according to the respective table published by FIBA. Countries in italics'' no longer compete at the EuroBasket.

Notes
According to FIBA, Yugoslavia competed until 2001.

Participating nations

Notes
According to FIBA, Yugoslavia competed until 2001.

Most successful players

Boldface denotes active basketball players and highest medal count among all players (including these who not included in these tables) per type.

Multiple gold medalists

Multiple medalists
The table shows players who have won at least 6 medals in total at the EuroBasket.

Awards

Below are the lists of all players voted as the MVPs and the Top Scorers of each EuroBasket edition. Krešimir Ćosić and Pau Gasol are the only players to win the MVP award twice. Nikos Galis and Radivoj Korać were the Top Scorers 4 times each.

MVP and Top scorer by country

Most times MVP and Top scorer by Players

Player scoring records

Most career points scored
 Counting all games played through the end of EuroBasket 2017, and not counting qualification games.

Highest career points per game average
 Counting all games played through the end of EuroBasket 2017, and not counting qualification games.

See also
 Basketball at the Summer Olympic Games
 FIBA EuroBasket Records
 FIBA EuroBasket MVP
 FIBA EuroBasket Top Scorer
 FIBA EuroBasket All-Tournament Team
 FIBA World Cup
 FIBA World Cup Records
 FIBA's 50 Greatest Players (1991)
 FIBA EuroBasket Division B (defunct)
 FIBA European Championship for Small Countries
 FIBA EuroBasket Women
 List of FIBA EuroBasket winning head coaches

References

External links

 
 
European championships
Recurring sporting events established in 1935
1935 establishments in Europe